Reed Clark Rollins (7 December 191128 April 1998) was an American botanist, professor at Harvard University and one of the founders of both the International Association for Plant Taxonomy and the Organization for Tropical Studies. He was also the second president of each of them.

Sources 
 Al-Shehbaz, Ihsan A. "Reed Clark Rollins (7 December 1911 – 28 April 1998)" Taxon  48(2): pp. 225–56
 Campbell, Christopher S. and Greene, Craig W. (1988) "A Tribute to Reed Clark Rollins, Recipient of the 1987 Asa Gray Award" Systematic Botany 13(1): pp. 170–171

References

Botanist designation

External links 
 Al-Shehbaz, Ihsan A. (1999) "Reed Clark Rollins", Biographical Memoir at National Academy Press

 

American taxonomists
1911 births
1998 deaths
Harvard University faculty
People from Wyoming
American founders
20th-century American botanists
University of Wyoming alumni
Harvard University alumni